Aygestan or Ballyja is a village that is, de facto, in the Askeran Province of the breakaway Republic of Artsakh; de jure, it is in the Khojaly District of Azerbaijan, in the disputed region of Nagorno-Karabakh. The village has an ethnic Armenian-majority population, and also had an Armenian majority in 1989.

History 
The modern village was founded in the 17th century. During the Soviet period, the village was part of the Askeran District of the Nagorno-Karabakh Autonomous Oblast.

Historical heritage sites 
Historical heritage sites in and around the village include tombs from the 2nd–1st centuries BCE, a 12th/13th-century village, the 12th/13th-century Tamtsi Church, the 12th/13th-century shrine of Prshni Nahatak, a 13th-century khachkar, a cemetery from between the 17th and 19th centuries, and the church of Surb Astvatsatsin built in 1850.

Economy and culture 
The population is mainly engaged in agriculture and animal husbandry, as well as in different state institutions. As of 2015, the village has a municipal building, a house of culture, a secondary school, a kindergarten, and a medical centre. The village is home to the Artsakh Brandy Company.

Demographics 
The village had 1,091 inhabitants in 2005, and 1,084 inhabitants in 2015.

Gallery

References

External links 

 

Populated places in Askeran Province
Populated places in Khojaly District